Noble Wilson was an American Negro league outfielder in the 1910s.

Wilson made his Negro leagues debut in 1918 with the Dayton Marcos. He went on to play for the St. Louis Giants the following season.

References

External links
Baseball statistics and player information from Baseball-Reference Black Baseball Stats and Seamheads

Year of birth missing
Year of death missing
Place of birth missing
Place of death missing
Dayton Marcos players
St. Louis Giants players
Baseball outfielders